The 598th Range Squadron is an active United States Air Force unit.  It is assigned to the 23d Fighter Group and is stationed at Avon Park Air Force Range, Florida where it replaced Detachment 1, 23d Fighter Group on 22 September 2015.  The 598 RANS also operates the Deployed Unit Complex (DUC) at MacDill Air Force Base, Florida.

It was first activated at MacDill Field, Florida in April 1943 as the 598th Bombardment Squadron.  After training in the United States, it transferred to the European Theater of Operations, where it was a component of IX Bomber Command.  The squadron served in combat from April 1944 until the end of World War II, earning a Distinguished Unit Citation for an attack on Ediger-Eller, Germany, in December 1944 during the Battle of the Bulge.  Following V-E Day the squadron remained in France until December 1945, when it returned the United States and was inactivated at Camp Kilmer.

History

World War II

The squadron was established at MacDill Field, Florida in April 1943 as one of the original squadrons of the 397th Bombardment Group, a B-26 Marauder medium bomber group. It drew its initial cadre from the 21st Bombardment Group. The squadron trained under Third Air Force at stations in the southeastern United States. After completing its training by participating in the Tennessee Maneuvers, the squadron departed Hunter Field, Georgia for the European Theater of Operations on 13 March 1944.

The squadron was temporarily stationed at RAF Gosfield upon its arrival in England in early April 1944.  On the 15th of the month, its parent group displaced the 363d Fighter Group at RAF Rivenhall and flew its first combat mission five days later. In preparation for Operation Overlord, the invasion of Normandy, the squadron attacked V-1 flying bomb launch pads, bridges, coastal defenses, marshalling yards and airfields in northern France.  On D-Day the squadron attacked strong points and bombed fuel dumps and other objectives to support ground forces throughout the Normandy Campaign.

In July 1944, the squadron attacked German forces near St Lo, France, during the Allied breakout there.  In August, the squadron moved from England to Gorges Airfield, an Advanced Landing Ground in France.  From there it attacked naval targets at Saint Malo and Brest.  Once on the Continent, the squadron made frequent moves forward as the Allied forces advanced during the Northern France Campaign. By September the squadron began flying missions into Germany, attacking depots and defended areas.

During the Battle of the Bulge, the squadron struck enemy lines of communications.  On 23 December 1944 the unit severed a railway bridge at Ediger-Eller, Germany, despite heavy flak and fighter opposition from the Luftwaffe.  For this action it was awarded a Distinguished Unit Citation.  The squadron continued to fly missions to support the Allied drive into Germany until 20 April 1945, exactly one year after its first combat mission, having completed 239 combat missions.

After V-E Day the squadron returned to its former base at Peronne Airfield, France, and remained there until December, when it returned to the United States.  Upon arrival at Camp Kilmer, New Jersey in late December 1945, the squadron was inactivated.

Range management
The squadron was redesignated 598th Range Squadron (598 RANS) and activated at the MacDill AFB Auxiliary Field at Avon Park Air Force Range, Florida on 22 September 2015.  It replaced Detachment 1, 23d Fighter Group, which had been managing the range and Deployed Unit Complex (DUC) previously.  The 598 RANS operates both the Avon Park Air Force Range (APAFR) in Polk County and Highlands County, Florida, as well as the Deployed Unit Complex (DUC) located at MacDill Air Force Base, Florida.

The squadron's higher headquarters is the 23d Fighter Group (23 FG), part of the 23d Wing (23 WG), located at Moody Air Force Base, Georgia.

Lineage
 Constituted as the 598th Bombardment Squadron (Medium) on 20 March 1943
 Activated on 20 April 1943
 Redesignated 598th Bombardment Squadron, Medium c. April 1944
 Inactivated on 31 December 1945
 Redesignated 598th Range Squadron
 Activated on 22 September 2015

Assignments
 397th Bombardment Group, 20 April 1943 – 31 December 1945
 23d Fighter Group, 22 September 2015 –  present

Stations

 MacDill Field, Florida, 20 April 1943
 Avon Park Army Air Field, Florida, 14 October 1943
 Hunter Field, Georgia, 1 November 1943 – 13 March 1944
 RAF Gosfield (Station 154), England, 5 April 1944
 RAF Rivenhall (Station 168), England, 15 April 1944
 RAF Hurn (AAF-492), England, 4 August 1944
 Gorges Airfield (A-26), France, 30 August 1944
 Dreux/Vernouillet Airfield (A-41), France, c. 16 Sep 1944
 Peronne Airfield (A-72), France, c. 8 October 1944
 Venlo Airfield (Y-55), Netherlands, 25 April 1945
 Peronne Airfield (A-72), France, 30 May – c. December 1945
 Camp Kilmer, New Jersey, 30 – 31 December 1945
 Avon Park Air Force Range, Florida, 22 September 2015 – present

Aircraft
 Martin B-26 Marauder, 1943–1945

Awards and campaigns

See also
 List of United States Air Force squadrons
 List of Martin B-26 Marauder operators

References

Notes

Bibliography

 
 
 
 
 

Squadrons of the United States Air Force